Shiesty Season is the debut mixtape by American rapper Pooh Shiesty. It was released on February 5, 2021, through Atlantic Records and 1017 Records. The mixtape features guest appearances from Lil Durk, Gucci Mane, Big30, 21 Savage, Veeze, Foogiano, Lil Hank, Choppa Wop, and Tay Keith. The "Spring Deluxe" edition of the mixtape was released on May 21, 2021. It features additional guest appearances from G Herbo, No More Heroes, and Lil Baby. A "Certified" edition of the mixtape was released on April 29, 2022. It features guest appearances from Gucci Mane, Jack Harlow, Lil Durk, and Lil Uzi Vert.

Background
The mixtape was announced on January 15, 2021, alongside the cover art and the release of the single "Guard Up". Following its release, Shiesty stated that it was "well overdue and well anticipated". It was released less than a year after he signed to Gucci Mane's 1017 Records, thanks to his viral track "Shiesty Summer". Prior to its release, Shiesty had released various singles through the label and appeared on the label compilation So Icy Summer.

According to Shiesty, the mixtape sees him "switching it up a lot. I got songs from every genre". In an interview with Zane Lowe, he said, "You getting Big Shiest on this mixtape — I'm touching on all categories. Expect me getting versatile. It's lit. You can expect some big features, shooting a video to every song on there. We're going all the way up". Stereogums Tom Breihan said the mixtape contains "eerie beats, weirdly catchy death-threats, tons of atmosphere. Rather than shooting for crossover ubiquity, Pooh is doing one thing really well"; as noted by The Faders Jordan Darville, the mixtape mainly sees Pooh Shiesty "display a slouched flow hinting at an effortlessness to his skills", as he details his heavy weaponry and his love for guns in his signature Memphis drawl. Shiesty stated, "I got big features, big producers on here and I got my main producers I been rocking with".

Singles
On November 6, 2020, Pooh Shiesty released the mixtape's lead single "Back in Blood", featuring fellow American rapper Lil Durk, which became his first Billboard Hot 100 entry, peaking at number 13 on the chart. "Guard Up" was released as the second single along with the announcement of the project on January 15, 2021. "Neighbors", featuring fellow American rapper Big30, was released as the third single on February 3, 2021.

Other songs
Pooh Shiesty released "Twerksum" as an official single on September 9, 2020, as a part of his label boss Gucci Mane's fifth compilation album, So Icy Gang, Vol. 1.

Commercial performance
Shiesty Season debuted at number four on the US Billboard 200 with 62,000 album-equivalent units in its first week of release. The mixtape also spent three weeks atop Apple Music's pre-add chart. A month later, the mixtape peaked at three on the Billboard 200.

Track listing

Personnel
Performers
 Pooh Shiesty – primary artist 
 Lil Durk – featured artist 
 Gucci Mane – featured artist 
 Big30 – featured artist 
 21 Savage – featured artist 
 Veeze – featured artist 
 Foogiano – featured artist 
 Lil Hank – featured artist 
 Choppa Wop – featured artist 
 Tay Keith – featured artist 

Technical and side musicians
 Skywalker OG – mixing, mastering 
 Harry Chaplin – mixing, mastering, guitar 
 Eddie "eMIX" Hernandez – recording 
 Nick Seeley – bass , guitar , bass guitar , mellotron , percussion , strings , piano , additional drums , additional vocals 
 Holly Seeley – additional vocals

Charts

Weekly charts

Year-end charts

Certifications

References

2021 debut albums
2021 mixtape albums
Albums produced by Tay Keith
Atlantic Records albums
Debut mixtape albums
Southern hip hop albums
Trap music albums